SS James Caldwell was a Liberty ship built in the United States during World War II. She was named after James Caldwell, a Presbyterian minister who played a prominent part in the American Revolution. Caldwell was an active partisan on the side of the Patriots, and was known as the "Fighting Parson". He was killed on 24 November 1781, by an American sentry in Elizabethtown, New Jersey, when he refused to have a package inspected. The sentry, James Morgan, was hanged for murder on 29 January 1782 in Westfield, New Jersey, amid rumors that he had been bribed to kill the chaplain.

Construction
James Caldwell was laid down on 8 August 1942, under a Maritime Commission (MARCOM) contract, MCE hull 915, by the Bethlehem-Fairfield Shipyard, Baltimore, Maryland; she was sponsored by Mrs. W.G. Esmond, the wife of the chief naval architect for MARCOM, in Washington DC, and was launched on 19 September 1942.

History
She was allocated to A.H. Bull & Co., Inc., on 26 September 1942. On 15 December 1948, she was laid up in the National Defense Reserve Fleet, Beaumont, Texas. On 28 June 1952, she was laid up in the National Defense Reserve Fleet, Mobile, Alabama. On 2 December 1974, she was transferred to the state of Mississippi for use as an artificial reef. She was removed from the fleet on 17 December 1974.

References

Bibliography

 
 
 
 

 

Liberty ships
Ships built in Baltimore
1942 ships
Mobile Reserve Fleet
Ships sunk as artificial reefs